The  2010 AFF U-16 Youth Championship will be held from 20 September to 26 September 2010, hosted by Indonesia.  Only four teams will be participating, three teams from member associations of the ASEAN Football Federation (AFF) and an invitee team from the East Asian Football Federation (EAFF).

Tournament 
All times are Western Indonesia Time (WIB) – UTC+7

Group stage

Third place play-off

Final

Winner

Goal scorers 
2 goals
 Liang Yu
 Rogerio Seran

1 goal

 Chen Shuo
 Shen Tianfeng
 Antoni Nugroho
 Nidio Alves
 Fidel Santos
 Dang Anh Tuan
 Nguyen Do
 Ho Ngoc Thang
 Nguyen Xuan Nam

Own goal
 Sun Zhengao (for Indonesia)

External links 
AFF U-16 Championship 2010 at AFF official website

Under
2010–11 in Indonesian football
2010
2010
2010 in youth association football